The 1962 Alabama gubernatorial election took place on November 6, 1962. Incumbent Democrat John Malcolm Patterson was term limited and could not seek a second consecutive term.

Democratic Party nomination

At this time Alabama was de facto one-party state. Every Democratic Party nominee felt safe. The real contest for governor took place during this party's primaries.

Incumbent Governor John M. Patterson was barred from seeking a second consecutive term.

Candidates

 Albert Boutwell, Lieutenant Governor
 Bull Connor, Birmingham Public Safety Commissioner 
 Jim Folsom, former Governor
 Ryan DeGraffenried Sr., State Representative
 MacDonald Gallion, Attorney General
 J. Bruce Henderson
 Wayne Jennings
 George Wallace, former Circuit Judge and former State Representative

Among three main contenders – Folsom, DeGraffenried and Wallace – the former two were considered to be progressive or moderate. Folsom, who served as  Governor  from 1947 to 1951 and again from 1955 to 1959, was one of the first Southern chief executives who spoke out in favor of desegregation and voting rights for an African Americans, which led to him frequently clashing with the Legislature on a number of issues. DeGraffenried also ran as a moderate, especially on the race issues.

Wallace, who lost a close primary to Patterson in 1958, ran that year as a Folsom-style moderate (he was indeed a close Folsom ally), and even received the official NAACP endorsement, while Patterson ran as a strong segregationist, accepting the official Ku Klux Klan endorsement.

After he lost in 1958, Wallace adopted a strong segregationist stance as well in order to secure votes.

Results
In the primary, held on June 3, Wallace finished first but failed to win a majority. Folsom and DeGraffenried split the moderate vote, and DeGraffenried, as the second-place finisher, faced Wallace in the runoff. Many believed that a controversial TV appearance, in which Folsom appeared to be seriously drunk, cost him the election.

Wallace defeated DeGraffenried in the runoff, held on June 24.

Other nominations

The Republican Party did not field a candidate.

Wallace's sole rival was Frank P. Walls, an independent who was later an Alabama Conservative Party congressional candidate.

General election

As expected, Wallace won in a landslide.

References

1962
Alabama
Gubernatorial
November 1962 events in the United States
George Wallace